The Indian National Mathematical Olympiad (INMO) is a high school mathematics competition held annually in India since 1989. It is the third tier in the Indian team selection procedure for the International Mathematical Olympiad and is conducted by the Homi Bhabha Centre for Science Education (HBCSE) under the aegis of the National Board of Higher Mathematics (NBHM).

The Mathematical Olympiad Program is a five stage process conducted under the aegis of National Board for Higher Mathematics (NBHM). The first stage PRMO is conducted by the Mathematics Teachers’ Association (India). All the remaining stages are organized by Homi Bhabha Centre for Science Education (HBCSE).

Eligibility and participant selection process
The INMO is conducted by the MO Cell which is held on the third Sunday of January at 30 centers across the country. Prospective candidates first need to write the Pre-Regional Mathematical Olympiad (known as PRMO or Pre-RMO)  then the Regional Mathematical Olympiad of their respective state or region.  Around thirty students are selected from each region, to write the INMO. The best-performing students from the RMO (approximately 900) qualify for the second stage INMO.

Structure of the examination
Algebra, Geometry, Number theory and Combinatorics, Graph Theory. No calculator is allowed.

Further stages

The International Mathematical Olympiad Training Camp (IMOTC)
The qualifying students are invited to the International Mathematical Olympiad Training Camp (IMOTC), a one-month mathematics camp hosted by the Homi Bhabha Centre for Science Education in Mumbai. For first time participants, it usually extends from late April till the end of May, while it begins about 10–14 days later for senior participants. In this camp, the students are taught Olympiad mathematics and some other general mathematics. Four selection tests and two practice tests are held during this period and the top six students in the selection tests qualify to represent India in the International Mathematical Olympiad.

Pre-departure Training Camp for IMO
The selected team of 6 students goes through another round of training and orientation for about 10 days prior to departure for IMO.

International Mathematical Olympiad
The six member team selected at the end of IMOTC accompanied by a leader, a deputy leader and an observer  represents the country at the IMO, held in July each year in a different member country of the IMO. Ministry of Human Resource Development  (MHRD) finances international travel of the team, the leader and the deputy leader, while NBHM(DAE) finances the other expenditure connected with the international participation and the entire in-country programme.

Post-IMOTC training of qualified candidates for subsequent seasons
Students who qualify the INMO once and come to attend the IMO Training Camp are sent postal problems during the period July—December that they have to solve and send back (if they are still in school).
Based on their responses, some of the students are invited to the IMO Training Camp the next year directly. Others have to rewrite the INMO again (they do not have to write the Regional Mathematics Olympiad).
From 2021, postals have been scrapped and all students(including Senior batch) have to give INMO to be eligible for attending IMOTC.

Perks upon qualification
 INMO awardee are eligible to write a special entrance exam exclusive to them for admission in IIT Bombay B.S. in Mathematics course.
 INMO awardees are automatically eligible for admission to the B.Sc. (Hons) Mathematics course in the Chennai Mathematical Institute.
 Since 2008, INMO awardees applying for B. Stat or B. Math courses of the Indian Statistical Institute are directly called for the interview without having to write the written test. 
 INMO awardees are also eligible for an NBHM scholarship that currently stands at about Rs. 2500 per month, if they continue their studies in mathematics. They are also offered a 4-year programme of training in Mathematics through correspondence and periodic contact with a chosen faculty. The programme is also available to INMO awardees who do not pursue an undergraduate degree in Mathematics but have special interest in the subject. They are offered an annual cash award of Rs. 9,000 subject to satisfactory performance in the programme.
 Students who make it to the IMO are eligible for the Kishore Vaigyanik Protsahan Yojana (KVPY) fellowship provided they pursue their studies in the science subjects in India. The fellowship amount stands at Rs. 5000 per month.
 Indian team members who receive a gold, silver or bronze at IMO are given cash awards by the NBHM of Rs. 5,000, Rs. 4,000 and Rs. 3,000 respectively.
 All travel expenses for the IMO Training Camp and all expenses for the IMO are borne by the Ministry of HRD, Government of India.

See also

 International Mathematical Olympiad
 Junior Science Talent Search Examination

External links
 Information on RMO and INMO provided by Bhaskaracharya Pratishthana
 Indian National Mathematical Olympiad problems
 NBHM official page on Olympiads
 Official page of the MO cell
 Mathematics Olympiad Help Site - India
 Science Olympiad
 Mathematics Olympiad Multiple Choice Questions
 HBCSE Mathematical Olympiad page
 Math Olympiad in India - A Comprehensive Guide

References

International Mathematical Olympiad